The Left and Democratic Front (or Left and Secular Democratic Front) was a pre-poll alliance of political parties in the Indian state of Manipur, which was formed ahead of the 2017 Manipur Legislative Assembly election.

About the alliance
The political parties in the Front had a 35-point common minimum programme. Their manifesto was constituted on the Left Front models of Tripura and Kerala. Moirangthem Nara, who was the general secretary of CPI Manipur, was the Convenor of the alliance.

LDF projected itself as an alternative to both the Congress and the BJP. CPI and MNDF are the dominant parties in the alliance as both have MLAs and ministers in previous Governments. Arvind Kejriwal was invited as their star campaigner in the election.

Constituent parties
The constituent parties in the alliance are:
Communist Party of India (CPI)
Communist Party of India (Marxist) (CPIM)
Nationalist Congress Party (NCP)
Janata Dal (United) (JD(U))
Aam Admi Party (AAP)
People's Democratic Alliance (PDA) 
Manipur National Democratic Front (MNDF)

LDF contested for 52 seats including 2 independents in the 60-member Manipur Legislative Assembly elections of 2017. LDF also had supported Irom Sharmila, who contested from PRJA, on the chief minister's seat. The alliance was dismissed after the election.

See also
Left and Secular Alliance
Manipur Progressive Secular Alliance

References

2017 establishments in Manipur
2022 disestablishments in India
Defunct political parties in Manipur
Defunct political party alliances in India
Political parties disestablished in 2022
Political parties established in 2017